This is a list of episodes for the Disney Channel series The Jersey.

Series overview

Episodes

Season 1 (1999–2000)
Note: The pilot episode "The Magic Jersey" was filmed in 1998, but the rest of the series was filmed in 1999 for the 1999–2000 season.

Season 2 (2000–01)

Season 3 (2002–04)
Note: Production for this season began and ended in 2001, but remained unaired until the 2002–2003 season with the first 18 episodes airing during that season. The last five episodes remained unaired until the 2003–2004 season.

Lists of American sitcom episodes
Lists of Disney Channel television series episodes

External links
 "The Jersey" at the TVGuide.com